CJF may refer to
Canadian Journalism Foundation
Center for the Jewish Future
Centre for Justice and Faith
Charles James Fox
Coondewanna Airport, IATA airport code "CJF"
Concrete Jungle Foundation